Joseph L. Burlazzi (May 20, 1912 – March 23, 1943) was a private in the United States Army who was posthumously awarded the Distinguished Service Cross for his conduct during military operations in North Africa during World War II. He became the Belleville, New Jersey area's "first local war casualty" on March 23, 1943, when he was killed while fighting at the front near Tunisia.

Formative years
Born in Smith Mills, Union Township, Clearfield County, Pennsylvania on May 20, 1912, Joseph L. Burlazzi considered Essex, New Jersey his hometown and, by his early to mid-20s, resided on Mt. Pleasant Avenue in Belleville, New Jersey.

World War II
After enlisting in the United States Army at Newark, New Jersey on October 22, 1940, for a term of service with the army's Philippine Department, Burlazzi was assigned Army Serial Number 12009274. Military records at the time noted that the highest level of education he had completed was "grammar school" and that, at the time of his enlistment, he was unmarried with no dependents. Following training at Fort Devens, Massachusetts, he and the other members of his unit boarded the troop transport,  in New York City and, on January 9, 1942, sailed for England, where they were stationed until they were sent to North Africa during the fall of that same year. 

While serving as a rifleman with the U.S. Army's 1st Infantry Division (also known as the "Big Red One"), Burlazzi was killed by friendly fire from U.S. Artillery guns on March 23, 1943, while operating a machine gun in the Battle of Tunisia on the North African front as Allied forces were engaged in combat with Axis tanks and infantry. At the time of his death, he had been a veteran of ten successive battles, and had also been credited with aiding in the capture of troops from Nazi Germany.

In his book, Patton's First Victory: How General George Patton Turned the Tide in North Africa and Defeated the Afrika Korps at El Guettar, author Leo Barron recounts how the fighting unfolded that day near El Guettar, Tunisia, including the final assault by German tanks and infantry "at 1640 hours." As one company of outnumbered U.S. artillerymen were forced to retreat from the base of Dj bou Rhedja (Hill 483) after spiking their guns, members of the U.S. 18th Infantry's 1st Battalion were reporting that German infantry and panzers had surrounded the 18th's 3rd Battalion at the El Keddah Ridge (Hill 336), and were also approaching the rear of the 1st Battalion. Nearly also pushed to retreat by approaching panzers and infantry around this same time were soldiers assigned to the 32nd Field Artillery's Battery A who, at 1737 hours, were ordered, to hold their position at all cost. 

Also around the same time, Burlazzi and other members from K Company in the "Big Red One" (1st Infantry) were fighting to protect another hill on the U.S. Army's southern flank. Facing a German halftrack advance and running low on ammunition, they took up defensive positions behind rocks, and began firing down from their high ground. Shortly thereafter, Burlazzi and private first class Raymond F. Villeneuve volunteered to seize and wield an abandoned M1917 machine gun. "Creeping and crawling under heavy artillery, grenades, and small-arms fire, the two privates finally obtained the gun, and placed it in action," according to the citation for valor they later received.

But, just as they were gaining the advantage militarily, Burlazzi and Villeneuve were hit by a barrage from a U.S. artillery battery that mistakenly fired on their position after having been given incorrect firing coordinates. Hit in the face and blinded, Villeneuve survived; however, Burlazzi and 36 others were killed.

In recognition of his bravery, Joseph Burlazzi was posthumously awarded the Distinguished Service Cross, which was accepted on his behalf by his brother, Guido. Describing Joseph Burlazzi's final act of valor, Brigadier General E. L. Ford wrote:

Burlazzi's grave is located in section H, plot 9611 at the Long Island National Cemetery in East Farmingdale, New York.

Citation
The following is a synopsis of Burlazzi's citation:

References

External links
 "Joseph L. Burlazzi" (memorial with photos of military headstone). Salt Lake City, Utah: Find A Grave, retrieved online February 23, 2019.

1912 births
1943 deaths
United States Army personnel killed in World War II
People from Clearfield County, Pennsylvania
Recipients of the Distinguished Service Cross (United States)
United States Army soldiers